Giuliana Nenni (1911–2002) was an Italian journalist and politician. She served in the Italian Parliament and Senate for the Italian Socialist Party. She was known as the sister of all Romagna’s women.

Early life and education
Giuliana Nenni was born in Forlì on 26 December 1911. She was the eldest daughter of Pietro Nenni, leader of the Italian Socialist Party, and Carmen Emiliani. Her father was in prison when Giuliana was born. She had a sister, Luciana, who was ten years younger of her.

When her family was in exile in Paris from 1926 Nenni attended the courses on French civilization at the Sorbonne University.

Career and activities
Nenni edited a socialist newspaper entitled Populaire in Paris. She joined the Italian Socialist Party in 1934. She and her family returned to Italy after the Fascist rule ended in 1943. In 1944 she involved in the establishment of a leftist resistance movement in Rome, Unione Donne Italiane (UDI). She was a member of the Italy-USSR association which was established by the Italian Socialist Party and the Italian Communist Party in 1949.

In 1948 Nenni was elected to the Italian Parliament for the Italian Socialist Party from Bologna and also, served at the Parliament for the next term. She became a member of the Italian Senate in 1958 and served there for two successive terms. In June 1958 the socialist deputy Luigi Sansone presented a proposal to introduce a divorce law to the Senate in collaboration with Giuliana Nenni which was not supported by the Senate. From 1968 Nenni began to work as the private secretary of her father, Pietro Nenni.

Following the death of Pietro Nenni in January 1980 his daughters, Giuliana and Luciana, established the Pietro Nenni Foundation.

Personal life and death
Nenni was not married and had no children. She died in Rome on 19 March 2002.

References

External links

20th-century Italian journalists
20th-century Italian women politicians
1911 births
2002 deaths
Italian Socialist Party politicians
Deputies of Legislature I of Italy
Deputies of Legislature II of Italy
Senators of Legislature III of Italy
Senators of Legislature IV of Italy
Daughters of national leaders
Italian expatriates in France
Italian newspaper editors
Italian women journalists
Women members of the Chamber of Deputies (Italy)
Women members of the Senate of the Republic (Italy)